Mystic Marriage of Saint Catherine is an oil painting on canvas of  by Paolo Veronese. It was in the Liechtenstein Collection by 1767 and was acquired in 1926 by Catherine Barker Spaulding Hickox, who in 1970 bequeathed it to its present owner, the Barker Welfare Foundation. It is currently on long-term loan from the Foundation to Yale University Art Gallery.

References

1550 paintings
Veronese
Paintings in the Yale University Art Gallery
Paintings by Paolo Veronese